Shamkir may refer to:

Shamkir (city), a city in Azerbaijan
Shamkir District, a district of Azerbaijan
Shamkir FC, a football club in Shamkir

See also